Qila-i-Kuhna Mosque (Mosque of the Old Fort) is a mosque located inside the premises of Purana Qila (Old Fort) in Delhi, the capital of India.

After Sher Shah Suri defeated Humayun, he occupied Purana Qila. There, he built the mosque for his private use, which became a "symbol of his royal aspiration".

Location 
The mosque is located inside Sher Shah Suri's fort, Purana Qila, which became his fortification after he won Delhi. It is one of the structures beside the Sher Mandal (which is attributed as Humayun's library) present in the fort. The fort is located near the Delhi zoo.

History 
The mosque's history is derived from various accounts of contemporary historians. The Tarikh-i-Sher Shahi, written by Abbas Sarwani, says that Sher Shah Suri built the mosque in 1540, from "gold, lapis lazuli" and other precious stones. He is said to have built the mosque to "revive" the city's status "as a major city". Historian MC Joshi argues that although Sher Shah completed the mosque, it was originally "designed" and its construction was started by Humayun. Joshi believes that Sher Shah built the upper part of the mosque which included the dome. The marble works of the exterior walls could be attributed to his son Akbar, because the geometric works are of his time and not of pre-Akbar era. The use of half-dome, pointed arches represents "A strong Mughal association". Humayun is credited with "introducing pietra dura" works in the liwan and mihrab.

Features 

The mosque is built in the Afghan style of a congregational mosque. It is a symbol of the architectural tradition of "a five bay mosque", a concept which was developed during the Sayyid and Lodi dynasty times. The mosque lacks any inscription. The mosque was built by "core masonry" with stone rubble "bonded with lime mortar". Blocks of quartzite, marble and red sandstone were also used in the construction process. The internal rectilinear hall is laterally divided by five arches. The external facade comprises the same number of arches. The central arch is sunken "in an arched recess" which is contained within a rectangular frontage called liwan. The mosque was originally intended to be constructed from marble but as it ran out of supply, red sandstone had to be used.

From the liwan rises the dome, built in the Lodi style, flanked by small minarets called guldastas (flower bouquets). The dome on the central bay has a kalash finial on top. There are also "multiple openings" in the "drum" for ventilation and is decorated with intricate tile work. The internal part of the mosque has five mihrabs, one in each bay, corresponding to the external facade. The mihrabs, with alternate fark and light coloured stones, are similar to that of the Atala Masjid in Jaunpur. Flat domes are present on the "penultimate bays". The end bays are oblong in shape but the penultimate ones are square shaped. There are two half arches in the last bay which tangentially spring from the "shoulders of lateral arches", resulting in the creation of three spaces spanned with a cross-rib arrangement. There is a shallow dome in the central space, whereas the eastern and western arcades have semi-domes called "nim-gumbad" which rest on "suspending arches".

Two octagonal turrets are attached to the ends of the rear wall, "which are functional as well as structural". In the edifice, objects reminiscent of Tughlaq architecture (decorative brackets with oriel windows, sunshades, narrow turrets) are found. The walls are ornamented with hexagonal star motifs which have coloured geometric patterns. The walls are filled with calligraphy. The mosque has two internal staircases located in the end bays. They were used to reach the terrace and the turrets. It also had private entrances on the north and south sides which are currently closed. The mosque also has "cusped entrance arches", a feature common during the reign of Alauddin Khalji.

Gallery

Notes

References 
 
 
 
 
 

Mosques in Delhi
Religious buildings and structures completed in 1541
1541 establishments in India
Mosques completed in the 1540s